Pseudorhadinorhynchus is a genus of parasitic worms belonging to the family Illiosentidae.

Species:

Pseudorhadinorhynchus cinereus 
Pseudorhadinorhynchus cochinensis 
Pseudorhadinorhynchus deeghai

References

Illiosentidae
Acanthocephala genera